Ekta Kapoor (born 7 June 1975) is an Indian television producer, film producer and director who works in Hindi cinema and soap opera. She is the joint managing director and creative head of Balaji Telefilms Limited, which was founded in 1994. In 2001, Balaji Motion Pictures was launched as a subsidiary company of Balaji Telefilms Limited which is a film production and distribution company. She launched ALT Balaji in April 2017.

In 2017, Kapoor also launched her biography, Kingdom of the Soap Queen: The Story of Balaji Telefilms.

Kapoor was honoured with the Padma Shri in 2020 for her work in the field of arts.

Personal life

Ektaa Kapoor is the daughter of actors Jeetendra and Shobha Kapoor. Her younger brother, Tusshar Kapoor, is also a Bollywood actor.

She went to school at Bombay Scottish School, Mahim and attended college at Mithibai College.

Kapoor is not married but she has a son named Ravie Kapoor, who was born on 27 January 2019 by surrogacy .

Career
Ektaa Kapoor started her career at the age of 17, interning with advertisement and feature filmmaker Kailash Surendranath. After obtaining financing from her father, she was a producer under her banner Balaji Telefilms. In 1995, Mano Ya Na Mano was selected by Zee TV and her music-based show Dhun Dhamaka was chosen by Doordarshan. Her 1995 sitcom, Hum Paanch was her first success.

In the 2000s, the letter 'K' became her lucky alphabet and she launched many shows with the first word of every title starting with the same letter, including Kyunki Saas Bhi Kabhi Bahu Thi, which broke all records to become the series to attract the highest TRPs in 2000. Other shows beginning with 'K' include Kahaani Ghar Ghar Ki, Kabhii Sautan Kabhii Sahelii, Kohi Apna Sa, Kaahin Kissii Roz, Kalash, Kasautii Zindagii Kay, Kahiin To Hoga and Kasamh Se. In 2001, she was awarded the title of Best Entrepreneur of the Year.

By July 2001, Kapoor was producing more than 30 hours of television shows per week. 20 of her 34 serials were listed as the most popular serials, across all major TV channels like Zee TV, Sony, Star Plus and Metro.

After establishing herself in Hindi TV serials, she began venturing into other regional languages, starting with the Tamil series, Kudumbum. The series became very popular and she then got it dubbed into Telugu and launched it in Hindi as Ghar Ek Mandir. She then ventured into Punjabi, Marathi, Gujarati and Bengali languages. , Kapoor wrote her own scripts despite having writers working for her, taking an active interest in all stages of production, while her mother, Shobha, handled the accounts.

Kapoor has thus created and produced more than 130 Indian soap operas. Some of her other popular shows include Pavitra Rishta, Bade Acche Lagte Hain, Yeh Hai Mohabbatein, Jodha Akbar, Naagin, Kumkum Bhagya, Kasam Tere Pyaar Ki, Kundali Bhagya, Yeh Hai Chahatein and several others that were credited with starting a new wave on Indian television, leading to her being known as the "Czarina of television" and "the Queen of Indian Television".

She ventured into Bollywood movie production in 2001 beginning with Kyo Kii... Main Jhuth Nahin Bolta, starring Sushmita Sen and Govinda. Kucch To Hai and Krishna Cottage, based on supernatural themes, followed in 2003 and 2004. The 2005 Kyaa Kool Hai Hum featured her brother Tusshar Kapoor. She then went on to co-produce Shootout at Lokhandwala with Sanjay Gupta. This was followed by Mission Istanbul and EMI – Liya Hai Toh Chukana Padhega in collaboration with Sunil Shetty. None of these films were commercial or critical successes.

Between 2010 and 2014, she produced many unsuccessful films, including Love Sex aur Dhokha, Once Upon a Time in Mumbaai, and Shor in the City.

In 2012, Ekta a Kapoor started the Institute of Creative Excellence, a media training school through her production house Balaji Telefilms.

Kapoor has also launched a number of TV series online through her digital app ALTBalaji.

Collected works

Television
The following is the list of Television shows produced by Kapoor under her banner Balaji Telefilms. Note: television series in bold are the shows presently on air.

Movies
The following is the list of motion pictures produced by Kapoor under her banner Balaji Motion Pictures.

Web series
The following is the list of web series created/developed/produced by Kapoor under her banner ALT Digital Media Entertainment for her video on demand platform ALT Balaji.

Accolades

Kapoor also works on script writing, creative conversion and concept building. Having been chosen as one of 50 of ‘Asia's Most Powerful Communicators’ by Asia Week magazine in 2001, she has helped launch the careers of many actors and actresses.

She was chosen to lead the Confederation of Indian Industries (CII) entertainment committee. The other awards she received are; The Society Achiever Award and The Best Entrepreneur of the Year 2001.

Kapoor is regarded as one of the most powerful ladies in the television industry and is amongst the top 25 woman entrepreneurs of India.

She was awarded Padma Shri, the fourth highest civilian honour, in 2020 for her work in the field of arts.

Kapoor has also received awards as the producer of Balaji Telefilms. These include the Indian Television Academy Awards, Indian Telly Awards, Kalakar Awards, Asian Television Awards, Apsara Awards, Zee Rishtay Awards, 3rd Boroplus Awards, New Talent Awards, BIG Star Entertainment Awards, 4th Boroplus Awards, GR8! Women Awards, Asia's Social Empowerment Awards, Lions Gold Awards, Stardust Awards, Screen Awards, Pune International Film Festival, Zee Gaurav Puraskar, National Media Network Film and TV Awards, the Global Indian Film and TV Honors, and ETC Bollywood Business Awards.

The following is the recent list of awards received by Kapoor:

References

External links

 
 
 

1975 births
Living people
Indian women television producers
Indian television producers
Mithibai College alumni
Indian women film producers
Hindi film producers
Sindhi people
Film producers from Mumbai
Businesswomen from Maharashtra
20th-century Indian businesswomen
20th-century Indian businesspeople
21st-century Indian businesswomen
21st-century Indian businesspeople
Women television producers
Recipients of the Padma Shri in arts